Sweating the Plague is the 29th album released by Guided by Voices, released on October 25, 2019.

Track listing 
All songs written by Robert Pollard.
 "Downer" – 3:13
 "Street Party" – 2:00
 "Mother's Milk Elementary" – 2:24
 "Heavy Like the World" – 3:13
 "Ego Central High" – 3:02
 "The Very Second" – 4:43
 "Tiger on Top" – 3:02
 "Unfun Glitz" – 2:54
 "Your Cricket (Is Rather Unique)" – 3:02
 "Immortals" – 3:08
 "My Wrestling Days Are Over" – 2:12
 "Sons of the Beard" – 4:48

Personnel
 Robert Pollard – vocals
 Doug Gillard – guitar
 Bobby Bare Jr. – guitar
 Mark Shue – bass guitar, backing vocals on "Your Cricket"
 Kevin March – drums, lead vocals on "Your Cricket"
 Travis Harrison – drums on "Your Cricket"

References 

2019 albums
Guided by Voices albums